The New York Latin American Art Triennial (formerly Bronx Latin American Art Biennial) is an event that takes place every three years. It is dedicated to presenting contemporary Latin American art in New York City.

History 
The New York Latin American Art Triennial (NYLAAT) was stablished by the Bronx Hispanic Festival (BHF) in 2008, under the name Bronx Latin American Art Biennial. It was co-founded by artists/curators Luis Stephenberg and Alexis Mendoza. In 2019, the event moved to a triennial format and took its current name, New York Latin American Art Triennial.

The broad range of Triennial artists have included representation from Argentina, Bolivia, Chile, Colombia, Costa Rica, Cuba, Dominican Republic, Ecuador, El Salvador, Guatemala, Honduras, Mexico, Nicaragua, Panama, Paraguay, Peru, Puerto Rico, Spain, Uruguay and Venezuela.

The New York Latin American Art Triennial is based in New York City, and it frequently partnered with galleries, museums and local arts and educational organizations to present contemporary art within the city's cultural context, featuring works that range from photography to art installations, from performance art to sculpture

Partner institutions have included: the Bronx Museum of the Arts, the Bronx Music Heritage Center, Hebrew Home Riverdale, Taller Boricua, Lehman College, Boricua College Art Gallery, BronxArtSpace, Longwood Art Gallery at Hostos Community College, Andrew Freedman Home, Poe Park Visitors Center Gallery, Clemente Soto Velez Cultural Center, Loisaida Center and Rio Gallery.

NYLAAT has showcased the work of hundreds of artists whose works have touch on themes important to the community such as migration, women's rights and other issues of social justice.

For the 2016 edition Chief Curator Alexis Mendoza and Triennial Director Luis Stephenberg invited  Associate Curators Ismael Checo, Miguel Lescano, Yarisa Colón and Josue Guarionex Colón to be part of the  curatorial committee.

Recent developments 
In 2021 associate curators/artists Alex Fdez Fernandez, Ezequiel Taveras, Franck de las Mercedes, Julia Justo, Lidia Hernandez and Naivy Perez joined the curatorial committee to support the work of Alexis Mendoza and Luis Stephenberg for the NYLAAT 2022 edition.

The 2022 triennial is titled "Abya Yala: Structural Origins”: Pre-Columbian, African, European influence and the compulsive change of the contemporary era.

References

External links 

 

Recurring events established in 2008
2008 establishments in New York (state)
Art festivals in the United States